William Biddlecombe (by 1488–1546/47), of Poole, Dorset was an English merchant, mayor and Member of Parliament.

He was a Member (MP) of the Parliament of England for Poole in 1529, ?1536 and ?1539. He was Mayor of Poole 1515–16, 1521–22, 1530–31, 1536–37 and 1543–44.

References

15th-century births
1546 deaths
16th-century English people
People of the Tudor period
People from Poole
Members of the Parliament of England (pre-1707)
Mayors of Poole